Stefan Yanev (born Stefan Georgiev Garofalo) is a former Bulgarian football player, sports journalist and writer.

Club career
Stefan Yanev (77) was born on 3 April 1939 in Varna, Bulgaria. He played for Cherno More Varna (1958–1969) with 229 matches and 16 goals in the Bulgarian A Football Group on his account.  Yanev started his career as a central forward for Lokomotiv Varna but eventually settled in a midfield position as a playmaker with a taste for goal. While doing his compulsory Army service playing for "Rodni krile" Sofia, Lokomotiv merged with another Varna team (Korabostroitel) and competed in the second level (Group "B”) of Bulgarian football, under the name DFS Cherno More. One year later, in 1959, DFS Cherno More merged with Botev Varna (Group "A”) renaming the club. Yanev made his first appearance for Cherno More on 27 September 1959 in a match against Akademik Sofia (4–0) in which he scored two of the goals. He quickly established himself as a leader in the midfield. Yanev took part in the club's England tour in August 1966, opening the score in a match against Coventry City on Highfield Road. The match ended in a 1–1 draw.

Journalist and writer
He stopped playing at the age of 29 to pursue a career as a sports journalist. His final match was a 0–0 draw against Beroe in Varna on 8 December 1969. Stefan Yanev was one of the founders of the Varna Television Centre in 1972. Yanev wrote articles and opinions in the popular newspapers "Narodno delo", "Naroden sport" and "Start". He appeared as a commentator and a pundit for the Bulgarian National Television and as such, he commented life from the World Cup finals 1982 in Spain, 1986 in Mexico, 1990 in Italy and 1994in USA. Yanev was on air for live radio commentaries from the UEFA Euro 1996 in England and 1998 FIFA World Cup in France.

Stefan Yanev wrote 17 books on Bulgarian football.  He is a co writer of the encyclopedic edition "The football in Varna" which throws a comprehensive view over the football events in his native Varna over the years.

References

External links
Player Profile at chernomorefc.com

First Professional Football League (Bulgaria) players
Bulgarian journalists
Living people
1939 births
PFC Cherno More Varna players
Sportspeople from Varna, Bulgaria
Association football midfielders
Bulgarian footballers